Giuseppe Menardi (born 1 July 1953) is an Italian politician who served as Mayor of Cuneo from 1990 to 1995 and as Senator for three legislatures (2001–2006, 2006–2008, 2008–2013).

References

1953 births
Living people
Mayors of Cuneo
Senators of Legislature XIV of Italy
Senators of Legislature XV of Italy
Senators of Legislature XVI of Italy
20th-century Italian politicians
21st-century Italian politicians
Christian Democracy (Italy) politicians
National Alliance (Italy) politicians
The People of Freedom politicians
People from Cuneo